Tatabrada TV is a Bosnian local commercial Cable television channel based in Srebrenik, BiH. The program is produced in Bosnian language, and it is available via cable systems throughout the Bosnia and Herzegovina.

References

External links 
 

Television stations in Bosnia and Herzegovina
Television channels and stations established in 2017
Companies of Bosnia and Herzegovina
Mass media companies established in 2017